Prothamnodes is a genus of moths in the family Xyloryctidae.

Species
Prothamnodes platycycla Meyrick, 1923 (from Myanmar)
Prothamnodes bathocentrella Viette, 1968 (from Madagascar)

References

Xyloryctidae
Xyloryctidae genera